Gmina Lewin Kłodzki is a rural gmina (administrative district) in Kłodzko County, Lower Silesian Voivodeship, in south-western Poland.

Neighbouring gminas
Gmina Lewin Kłodzki is bordered by the towns of Duszniki-Zdrój and Kudowa-Zdrój, and the gmina of Szczytna. It also borders the Czech Republic.

Villages
The gmina contains the villages of Dańczów, Darnków, Gołaczów, Jarków, Jawornica, Jeleniów, Jerzykowice Małe, Jerzykowice Wielkie, Kocioł, Krzyżanów, Kulin Kłodzki, Leśna, Lewin Kłodzki, Ludowe, Taszów, Witów, Zielone and Zimne Wody.

Twin towns – sister cities

Gmina Lewin Kłodzki is twinned with:
 Olešnice v Orlických horách, Czech Republic

References

Lewin Klodzki
Kłodzko County